I Honestly Love You is the soundtrack to the Australian biographical miniseries Olivia: Hopelessly Devoted to You, the first part of which screened on the Seven Network on 13 May 2018, with the second part to air on 20 May 2018. The miniseries tells the story of Olivia Newton-John, an Australian singer, songwriter and actress. The soundtrack comprises the star of the series, Delta Goodrem, performing covers of iconic songs from Newton-John's career and was released in Australia on 11 May 2018.

Upon announcement, Goodrem said “Having Olivia as a friend for all these years has been such an incredible gift. From a young age, she was an artist I admired and looked up to.”

The album was announced and available for pre-order on 29 April 2018 and came with the pre-order duet "Love Is a Gift", to which Newton-John explains "When we wrote "Love Is a Gift", we wrote it as a love song. Now, when [Delta and I] sing it, it's about friendship and love between friends and so it still has the same meaning; it's just a different time for the song."

Reception
David from AuspOp gave the album 3 out of 5 and wrote: "Listening through the songs, nothing is overly groundbreaking, but the covers do feel like they have had some attention paid to them". He called the album "decent enough" and "an opportunity to take a look at Olivia Newton-John's music from a different perspective", noting "Physical", "Anyone Who Had a Heart" and "Love Is a Gift" as highlights.

Track listing

Charts

Release history

References

2018 soundtrack albums
Delta Goodrem albums
Sony Music Australia albums
Soundtracks by Australian artists